Métopes, Op. 29, is a work for piano solo by the Polish composer Karol Szymanowski, completed in 1915. It is a cycle of three miniature tone poems drawing on Greek mythology.

Each of the three movements features a female character encountered by Odysseus on his homeward voyage. The movements are:
 "The Isle of the Sirens"
 "Calypso"
 "Nausicaa"

The work may have been inspired by the metopes of the temple at Selinunte.

The composition is the first of four piano works composed by Szymanowski during the First World War, an intensely productive period for the composer. In style it resembles impressionism and bitonal works by Ravel and Debussy.

References 
 Didier van Moere, CD booklet insert: Szymanowki Sonata no 3, Masques, Métopes, performed by Piotr Anderszewski, 2005
 Malcolm MacDonald, CD booklet insert: Szymanowski piano works and works for violin and piano, various performers, EMI classics 2005

External links 
 
 Lecture-recital by Mikoklaj Warszynski who has recorded the work on this album which appears on Spotify 

Compositions for solo piano
Compositions by Karol Szymanowski
1915 compositions
Suites (music)